O'Neil is a Canadian community, located in Westmorland County, New Brunswick. The community is situated in southeastern New Brunswick, to the north of Moncton.  O'Neil is part of Greater Moncton.

History

Notable people

See also
List of communities in New Brunswick
Greater Moncton
List of entertainment events in Greater Moncton

References

Bordering communities

Stilesville
Shaw Brook
Indian Mountain
McQuade
Ammon

Communities in Westmorland County, New Brunswick
Communities in Greater Moncton